The 1949 Hamilton Wildcats season was the ninth in franchise history and second for the club in Interprovincial Rugby Football Union. This would also be the last season for the Wildcats as the club would merge with the Hamilton Tigers following this season. 

The Wildcats finished in 4th place in the IRFU with a 0–12 record and did not qualify for the playoffs.

Preseason

Regular season

Season standings

Season schedule

References

Hamilton Tiger-Cats seasons
Hamilton